Labette County USD 506 is a public unified school district headquartered in Altamont, Kansas, United States.  The district includes the communities of Altamont, Angola, Bartlett, Dennis, Edna, Labette, Mound Valley, western and southern Parsons, and nearby rural areas.

Schools
There are five rural grade schools located in Altamont, Edna, Bartlett, Mound Valley, and an area southwest of Parsons called Meadow View. Labette County High School (LCHS) is located in Altamont. Grades 9-12 have a consistent enrollment of about 500 students. Since its founding in 1895, the school has prided itself on career, vocational, and technical training. LCHS has an agriculture department that includes a school farm. It also has an automotive technology department that completes both in-house projects as well as services for the community. LCHS has a building and trades department, one of the only electronics departments, a certified welding shop, a family/career science department, and a business-technology department. 

Labette County High School is considered a class 4A school and offers the KHSAA sports of: football, volleyball, cross country, basketball, wrestling, tennis, golf, baseball, softball, and track & field. LCHS has an award-winning theatre department and fine arts that include choir, band, 2D & 3D art classes. The school offers a variety of extra- and intra-curricular activities including: National FFA, FBLA (Future Business Leaders of America), FCCLA (Family and Career Consumer Leaders of America), Skills USA, and ITS (International Thespian Society). Also, LCHS has a math club, a stage band, a chess club, SADD (Students Against Destructive Decisions), and FCA (Fellowship of Christian Athletes).

Schools
 Labette County High School
 Altamont Grade School
 Bartlett Grade School
 Edna Grade School
 Meadow View Grade School
 Mound Valley Grade School

See also
 Kansas State Department of Education
 Kansas State High School Activities Association
 List of high schools in Kansas
 List of unified school districts in Kansas

References

External links
 

 School districts in Kansas
Education in Labette County, Kansas
1895 establishments in Kansas
School districts established in 1895